Barbara Aland, née Ehlers (born 12 April 1937 in Hamburg, Germany) is a German theologian and was a Professor of New Testament Research and Church History at Westphalian Wilhelms-University of Münster until 2002.

Biography 

After having completed her degree of Theology and Classical Philology in Frankfurt, Marburg and Kiel she received the PhD
(dissertation on the Socratic Aeschines) in 1964 in Frankfurt/Germany.
In 1969 she gained her licentiate at the "Oriental Faculty" of Pontificio Istituto Biblico in Rome, Italy.
In 1972 she could habilitate in Göttingen about the Syrian gnostic Bardesanes of Edessa.
Since 1972 she acted as private lecturer, later on she became professor for "Church History and New Testament Research with eminently consideration of
Christian Orient" at the Evangelisch-Theologischen Fakultät in Münster, Germany.
In 1983 she became director of the Institute for New Testament Textual Research (which was founded in 1959 by her husband Kurt Aland) and also the Bible Museum.

This institute achieved worldwide significance by publishing the "Nestle–Aland" – Novum Testamentum Graece and the UBS Greek New Testament.
Until her retirement Barbara Aland was also the director of Hermann Kunst-Stiftung for Promotion of New Testament Research.
She is still working academically in her retirement.

Relevance 
Aland gained an international profile due to the work on the Novum Testamentum Graece and the Greek New Testament
which she carried out with her husband Kurt Aland.
Both of them collaborated significantly with an international and interconfessional group of theologians on the approvement and updating of the "Nestle–Aland" – Novum Testamentum Graece and also "Greek New Testament".
These editions (published by the Institute in Münster) form the basis of apprenticeship and research worldwide.

She published the first installments of the "Editio Critica Maior" in 1997.
This edition was the first to be based on the complete tradition of Greek manuscripts, patristic citations, and ancient versions.

In 1999 she was a founding member of the "Academia Platonica Septima Monasteriensis", which does not focus its attention primarily on the works of Plato, but rather on the writings of his early interpreters, from ancient times until the Renaissance. The Academy's goal is to promote the study of Platonist writings.

Honors 

Barbara Aland achieved the following honorary doctoral degrees:
1988: "D.Litt." (Doctor of Literature), Wartburg College (Waverly/Iowa)
1989: "D.D." (Doctor of Divinity), Mount Saint Mary's College (Emmitsburg/Maryland)
2008: "Dr. theol. h.c.", (Doctor of Theology), University of Halle-Wittenberg, Germany

She received following awards:
1998: Paulus-Plakette of Münster, Germany
2005: Fellow of Clare Hall, Cambridge
2006: Member of the Royal Netherlands Academy of Arts and Sciences
2011: Knight's Cross (Bundesverdienstkreuz am Bande)
2016: Burkitt Medal for Biblical Studies

Works 
Monographs
 (as Barbara Ehlers): Eine vorplatonische Deutung des sokratischen Eros. Der Dialog Aspasia des Sokratikers Aischines. Diss. Frankfurt am Main 1964, published 1966 (Zetemata, issue 41).
 (with Kurt Aland): Der Text des Neuen Testaments. Einführung in die wissenschaftlichen Ausgaben sowie in Theorie und Praxis der modernen Textkritik, 1982.
 English translation: The text of the New Testament. An introduction to the critical editions and to the theory and practice of modern textual criticism. 1987.
 Erziehung durch Kirchengeschichte? Ein Plädoyer für mehr Kirchengeschichte im Religionsunterricht. Published: Idea e.V., 1984.
 Frühe direkte Auseinandersetzung zwischen Christen, Heiden und Häretikern. 2005.
 Was ist Gnosis? Studien zum frühen Christentum, zu Marcion und zur kaiserzeitlichen Philosophie. 2009
Editions of the New Testament
 A Textual Commentary on the Greek New Testament. A Companion Volume to the United Bible Societies Greek New Testament (third edition) by B. M. Metzger on behalf of and in cooperation with the Editorial Committee of the United Bible Societies Greek New Testament K. Aland, M. Black, C. M. Martini, B. M. Metzger and A. Wikgren, 1971.
 Novum Testamentum Graece post Eberhard Nestle et Erwin Nestle communiter ed. K. Aland, M. Black, C. M. Martini, B. M. Metzger, A. Wikgren, apparatum criticum recens. et editionem novis curis elaborav. K. Aland et B. Aland una cum Instituto studiorum textus Novi Testamenti Monasteriensi (Westphalia), 26. Aufl., 1979.
 Novum Testamentum Latine. Novam Vulgatam Bibliorum Sacrorum Editionem secuti apparatibus titulisque additis ediderunt Kurt Aland et Barbara Aland una cum Instituto studiorum textus Novi Testamenti Monasteriensi, 1984.
 Griechisch-deutsches Wörterbuch zu den Schriften des Neuen Testaments und der frühchristlichen Literatur by Walter Bauer. 6., völlig neu bearbeitete Auflage im Institut für Neutestamentliche Textforschung/Münster unter besonderer Mitwirkung von Viktor Reichmann hrsg. von Kurt Aland und Barbara Aland, 1988.
Publications
 Gnosis. Festschrift für Hans Jonas, in Verbindung mit Ugo Bianchi, hrsg. von Barbara Aland, 1978.
 Günther Zuntz: Lukian von Antiochien und der Text der Evangelien. Hrsg. von Barbara Aland und Klaus Wachtel. Mit einem Nachruf auf den Author von Martin Hengel, 1995.
 Die Weltlichkeit des Glaubens in der Alten Kirche. Festschrift für Ulrich Wickert zum siebzigsten Geburtstag. In Verbindung mit Barbara Aland und Christoph Schäublin hrsg. von Dietmar Wyrwa, 1997.
 Literarische Konstituierung von Identifikationsfiguren in der Antike, hrsg. von Barbara Aland, 2003.

References

External links 

 www.nestle-aland.com, Homepage of the Nestle–Aland 28
 Barbara Aland – NTTextforschung
 Zum 70. Geburtstag von Barbara Aland West AKT
 Nestle-Aland Ausgaben des griechischen Neuen Testaments Auflistung aller derzeit verfügbaren Ausgaben.

Living people
1937 births
20th-century Christian biblical scholars
20th-century German Protestant theologians
Women Christian theologians
German biblical scholars
Members of the Royal Netherlands Academy of Arts and Sciences
New Testament scholars
Writers from Hamburg
Academic staff of the University of Münster
Recipients of the Cross of the Order of Merit of the Federal Republic of Germany
German women academics
Female biblical scholars
20th-century German women